Abraham Lincoln High School is a public high school, founded in 1959, in Denver, Colorado, United States, and is named after former President Abraham Lincoln.

The school's colors are blue and grey, representing the colors worn by the soldiers during the US Civil War; blue represents the North, and grey represents the South. The original shade used in the school's colors was royal blue, distinguishing it from Manual High School's Carolina blue & John F. Kennedy's navy blue in the Denver Public School District. The blue was transitioned from royal to navy beginning in the late 1990s. Some instances can be seen where silver replaces grey.

The school's mascot is a Lancer, which is a jousting knight holding a pole arm/lance.

Abraham Lincoln High School's traditional rival high school is John F. Kennedy High School, although rivalries have also existed with West High School and North High School.

Both Abraham Lincoln High School and  John F. Kennedy High School have nearly exact original architecture.

As of the 2020-2021 school year ALHS currently has 964 students.

The principal is Antonio Esquibel, who returned to the job after his initial tenure from 2006-2011.

Abraham Lincoln High School is located in the Harvey Park neighborhood on the southwest side of Denver.

Demographics

89.9% Latino
3.3% African American
2.9% Caucasian
2.7% Asian
0.7% American Indian
0.4% Two or More Races

Grade Level

38.8% Freshman 9th grade
22.3% Sophomore 10th grade
18.4% Junior 11th grade
20.5% Senior 12th grade

Gender
54.8% Male
45.2% Female

Using federal government guidelines, 87% of the students were eligible for free or reduced-price lunches.

Academics
We prepare our students for college and careers through rigorous coursework, including 43 concurrent enrollment options, 3 Advanced Placement (AP) Courses and 5 Career and Technical Education (CTE) pathways, a minor in Spanish through Metropolitan State University of Denver and the opportunity to earn up to 12 college credits via concurrent enrollment options to participate in the DPS College First program.

We are a Transitional Native Language Instruction (TNLI) school that serves English Language Learners (ELL). We hold all our ELL students to the same standards towards college readiness as our native English speakers.

Improvement
Abraham Lincoln High School was one of 16 schools nationwide (one of four in Denver) selected by the College Board for inclusion in the EXCELerator School Improvement Model program beginning the 2007-2008 school year. EXCELerator includes a college prep curriculum designed to help students focus and succeed in college. The project was funded by the Bill & Melinda Gates Foundation.

Lincoln closely follows the SIOP (Sheltered Instructional Observation Protocol) model, has an outstanding JROTC program, and is part of the new Denver Scholarship Foundation, begun by Lincoln alum Tim Marquez, class of 1976.

The Denver Scholarship Foundation is a newly created partnership between community leaders, private donors, the City of Denver and Denver Public Schools. The foundation's mission is to provide post-secondary advising while a student attends Abraham Lincoln High School and financial assistance through a scholarship program for students who are admitted to one of 33 institutions in Colorado.

Sporting awards

On Saturday March 10, 2007, the Lincoln Lancers boys' basketball team won the class 4A Colorado state championship.  Lincoln defeated the Ralston Valley Mustangs by a score of 63-52.  This was Lincoln's first state title since a cross country win in 1968.  They went back-to-back in 2008 to win their second consecutive 4A Colorado state championship. The men's soccer team were state runner-up in 2009 while the baseball team set a school record with 17 wins in 2010.

State championships:

 Basketball (2007, 4A)
 Basketball (2008, 4A)
 Cross country (1960, I)
 Cross country (1961, I)
 Cross country (1962, I) 
 Cross country (1968, I)
 Gymnastics (1961)
 Gymnastics (1962)

Notable alumni

 Steve Blateric, former MLB player (Cincinnati Reds, New York Yankees, California Angels)
 Nick Capra, former MLB player (Texas Rangers, Kansas City Royals)
 Jorge Gutierrez, current LNBP player (Astros de Jalisco)

Notable faculty
 Arlene Hirschfeld, English teacher.

See also
Denver Public Schools

References

External links
 

High schools in Denver
Educational institutions established in 1961
Public high schools in Colorado
1961 establishments in Colorado